ね, in hiragana, or ネ in katakana, is one of the Japanese kana, each of which represents one mora. The hiragana is made in two strokes, while the katakana is made in four. Both represent .

As a particle, it is used at the end of a sentence, equivalent to an English, "right?" or "isn't it?" It is also used as slang in Japan to get someone's attention, the English equivalent being "hey" or "hey, you."

Stroke order

Other communicative representations

 Full Braille representation

References

 Computer encodings

Specific kana